Triângulo Mineiro e Alto Paranaíba is one of the twelve mesoregions of the Brazilian state of Minas Gerais. It is composed of 66 municipalities distributed across 7 microregions.

References 

Triângulo Mineiro e Alto Parabaíba